Pakten (English title: Waiting for Sunset (USA) or The Sunset Boys) is a 1995 Norwegian film directed by Leidulv Risan.

It made headlines in Norway as it was the first Norwegian film to star several respected Hollywood stars, namely veteran actors Robert Mitchum (whose mother was Norwegian), and Cliff Robertson. It also boasted some of the biggest acting names from Sweden (Erland Josephson), Germany (Hanna Schygulla and Ernst Jacobi), Austria (Nadja Tiller) and Norway.

It was directed and co-written by Leidulv Risan and shot on location in Oslo (Norway) and the German cities of Cologne and Heidelberg.

Its budget of 5,000,000 USD was above average for a Norwegian movie at the time.

Aging Norwegian doctor Carl (Espen Skjønberg) collapses in the streets of Oslo, and awakens in the hospital. To his great surprise he finds himself surrounded by his old buddies Ernest (Mitchum), Ted (Robertson) and August (Josephson). Taking matters into their own hands they "kidnap" the dying Carl and embark on an emotional journey back to Heidelberg, where they met studying medicine before World War II. Their plan is to fulfill Carl's final wish but soon find their cheerful trip overshadowed as they reveal a plot dating back to the pre-war Nazi era.

The movie received mainly fair reviews although many seemed to agree that the Nazi-subplot was too melodramatic, and got in the way of its feel-good nature.

Cast 
Robert Mitchum as Ernest Bogan 
Cliff Robertson as Ted Roth 
Erland Josephson as August Lind
Espen Skjønberg as Carl Berner
Hanna Schygulla as Eva Loehwe 
Nadja Tiller as Gertrude Boman 
Trine Pallesen as Nina
Bodil Kjer as Marianne Haas
Ingrid van Bergen as Wenche Haas
Ernst Jacobi as Leonard Haas
Ulrich Wildgruber as Reverend Berger
Kai Wiesinger as Fritz Becker
Joachim Kemmer as Johannes Christof
Ellen Horn as Nurse 
Oliver Nägele as Paul Zeppelin 
Sven Nordin as Dr. Sunde
Armin Rohde

Trivia 
While he had a supporting role in a 1997 TV movie, this was Hollywood-legend Robert Mitchum's last starring role on the big screen. It was the only time he had worked on a Norwegian movie (Mitchum's mother was Norwegian).

External links
 Pakten at Internet Movie Database

1995 films
Norwegian-language films
English-language Norwegian films
1990s German-language films
Films directed by Leidulv Risan
Films set in Germany
Films set in Heidelberg
1990s English-language films